The Linköping Arena is an association football stadium in Linköping, Sweden. Opened in 2013, the stadium has a capacity of 7,400 and hosted four games at the UEFA Women's Euro 2013 tournament. Following the tournament, the stadium became home to Linköpings FC women's association football team. The name was discussed for a while and the project name was Arena Linköping before at the inauguration it was announced as Linköping Arena.

References

External links
Linköping Arena
 Linköping Arena - Nordic Stadiums

Buildings and structures in Linköping
Football venues in Sweden
UEFA Women's Euro 2013 venues